Lotta's fountain is a fountain at the intersection of Market Street, where Geary and Kearny Streets connect in downtown San Francisco, California.
It was commissioned by actress Lotta Crabtree in 1875 as a gift to the city of San Francisco, and would serve as a significant meeting point in the aftermath of the 1906 San Francisco earthquake and fire.

History

The cast-iron fountain, commissioned by actress Lotta Crabtree as a gift to the city, was dedicated September 9, 1875. During its centennial it was designated both a San Francisco Designated Landmarks and the U.S National Historic Places.

A plaque commemorates its role as a meeting point in the aftermath of the 1906 San Francisco earthquake and fire. Another plaque mentions the opera soprano Luisa Tetrazzini, who gave a memorable performance for the people of San Francisco at the fountain on Christmas Eve, 1910, after legal difficulties prevented her from appearing on stage. The bronze column was added in 1916 to match the height of new lights being installed along Market Street.

In 1974 it was relocated from its original location at 3rd, Market and Kearny during the renovation of Market Street. In 1999 the fountain was refurbished to its 1875 appearance, repainted a metallic gold-brown. Its lion's-head spigots flow during daytime hours.

In 1919, a commemoration of the earthquake was started that still occurs annually. The South of Market Boys, a fraternal drinking organization, hung a wreath on the fountain. Since then, survivors of the earthquake gathered at 5:12 a.m. on April 18 at the intersection. After the 2015 anniversary, the last two survivors of the earthquake died. In 2016, more than 200 participants, many in period costuming, gathered to commemorate victims of the earthquake and to draw attention to earthquake preparedness.

See also

 List of San Francisco Designated Landmarks

References

Sources
O'Brien, Robert This is San Francisco Chronicle Books 1994, reprint from 1948

External links

Lotta Crabtree
Lotta Crabtree, Fairy Star of the Gold Rush
"Lotta's Legacy," by J. Kingston Pierce
"Lotta's Fountain," Atlas Obscura

Fountains in California
Financial District, San Francisco
Market Street (San Francisco)
1906 San Francisco earthquake
National Register of Historic Places in San Francisco
Buildings and structures on the National Register of Historic Places in California
San Francisco Designated Landmarks
Relocated buildings and structures in California